Chilwell is a village and residential suburb of Nottingham, in the borough of Broxtowe of Nottinghamshire, west of Nottingham city. Until 1974 it was part of Beeston and Stapleford Urban District, having been in Stapleford Rural District until 1935.

History
Roman buildings, pottery and coins have been found in Chilwell.
Chilwell was originally a hamlet on the road from Nottingham to Ashby-de-la-Zouch. It is mentioned in the Domesday Book, but along with Toton it became part of the parish of Attenborough. Suburban development spread gradually from Beeston along Chilwell High Road.

The area's population grew substantially during World War I, when most of the area of level ground between Chilwell and Toton was occupied by the National Shell Filling Factory No. 6 and the original direct route between Chilwell and Toton became a gated military road, now known as Chetwynd Road.

On 1 July 1918, 134 people were killed in an explosion at the factory, with over 250 people injured in the explosion. This tragedy remains the largest number of deaths caused by a single explosion in Britain. The memorial to the dead can be found in nearby church yard of St Mary's, Attenborough.

The army continued to dominate the area with the factory becoming a major depot site for the Royal Army Ordnance Corps, and more recently for the Royal Engineers. The Chilwell Bypass Road was constructed in the 1930s to take army traffic out of the village centre.

Chilwell had a number of pubs in its centre on Chilwell High Road. The Original Chequers Inn is on the border with Beeston and is a turn of the century pub that was once a coaching house, The Charlton Arms is named after a local landowning family who formerly lived in the now demolished Chilwell Hall. The Cadland is named after a locally trained racehorse that won The Derby in 1828. There is also a modern pub, The Cornmill, on Nottingham Road. There is a large retail park and hotel (The Village) on the Attenborough border.

Chilwell has had a long-standing non-conformist population. The Chilwell Methodist Church was founded in 1798 as the Methodist First Connection Chapel at Hallams Lane. Its Sunday School (provided jointly with local Baptists) provided the first free education for the poor of the area. The chapel moved to land provided by Squire Charlton in 1857. Christ Church, Chilwell was built in 1903 to provide an Anglican church to serve the growing population, although it did not become a separate ecclesiastical parish from Attenborough until 1975.

Since 1900
The Inham Nook estate (including the Inham Nook pub) was built by Beeston and Stapleford Urban District Council on land to the west of Bramcote Lane from the 1950s and St Barnabas's Church was constructed in 1957 as a "mission church" to serve the new population. For many years, Inham Nook's council housing was in sharp contrast to the surrounding areas of middle class suburban owner-occupation. Since the 1980s right to buy legislation, tenure has been more mixed, but Inham Nook remains relatively deprived compared to other areas in the southern part of Broxtowe borough.
However Broxtowe borough council in partnership with NET have recently spent £100,000 on refurbishment works to the Inham Nook sports pavilion to help improve local facilities for the community. The works included updating the changing facilities for local football teams, and improving the bowls facilities and accessibility to the pavilion. The works were carried out by local contractor GPS Construction (Nottingham)

Chilwell Manor Golf Club was established in 1906 on land formerly belonging to the Manor. The Manor House and nearby Chilwell Green remained intact until 1965 when the bland Clarkes Lane development of large detached houses started construction.

Chilwell War Memorial Hall and Institute was opened on 3 May 1924. It was built to commemorate the memory of the gallant men of the village who scarified their lives during the Great War. The Hall and Institute was established to be a place for assembly and recreation for the community and surrounding neighbourhoods, and still offers many activities to meet this aim.

Chilwell School is located off Queens Road West adjacent to the golf course. It shares a site and facilities with the Chilwell Olympia Sports Centre. Prior to construction of the school in the 1970s, this area was Kirk's Farm. It had remained undeveloped as the land has a high water table and poor drainage. A hectare of the school grounds was not drained for playing fields and is now the Chilwell Meadow nature reserve managed by the Nottinghamshire Wildlife Trust as a rare example of a "wet meadow" of unimproved grassland.

Parts of the golf course are also sites of importance for nature conservation, and there has been some work in recent years to remove non-native species in the golf-course planting to improve bio-diversity.

Demography
Chilwell population is 14,024 with the average household at 2.30 with the population density per hectare at 44.30

At the 2011 Census Chilwell had 2 wards (East and West). The total population of these two wards was 12,864.

There are 90.2% White British and 9.8% with people from 35 different countries including India, Pakistan, France, Germany, Poland, Jamaica, China, Ecuador, Australia, Ireland and the United States.

Transport

Attenborough railway station was for a short period renamed Chilwell, and is the closest National Rail station to Chilwell.

Line 1 of the Nottingham Express Transit tramway passes through Chilwell, and the following stops are in, or close to, Chilwell:

High Road – Central College
Cator Lane
Bramcote Lane
Eskdale Drive
Inham Road
Toton Lane

Chilwell is served by the following bus services:
 Nottingham City Transport
 36: Nottingham – Derby Road – QMC – Beeston – Chilwell
 N36: Nottingham – Derby Road – QMC – Beeston – Chilwell
 Trentbarton
 Indigo: Nottingham – Beeston – Chilwell – Long Eaton – Derby
 18: Nottingham – QMC – Beeston – Chilwell – Stapleford
 20: Nottingham – Beeston – Chilwell – Ilkeston – Heanor
 NottsBus (Nottinghamshire County Council)
 510: Beeston – Chilwell – Attenborough – Toton – Stapleford

See also
Listed buildings in Attenborough and Chilwell

References

External links

Chilwell Manor Golf Club
Then and Now: Attenborough, Chilwell and Beeston – 1920 local history article by Robert Mellors on Nottinghamshire History site

Villages in Nottinghamshire
Places in the Borough of Broxtowe